The 1985 Newfoundland general election was held on 2 April 1985 to elect members of the 40th General Assembly of Newfoundland. It was won by the Progressive Conservative party under Premier Brian Peckford.

Results

References
 Election Report

Further reading
 

Elections in Newfoundland and Labrador
Newfoundland general election
General election
Newfoundland general election